Eupithecia coccinea is a moth in the family Geometridae. It is found in Nepal and India.

References

Moths described in 1981
coccinea
Moths of Asia